See Birds is an EP by electronic musician Balam Acab, released in 2010 by Tri Angle.

Content
Much of the music on See Birds was produced using online-sourced samples, heavily modified and compiled into a form characterized as witch house. The EP is considered by some critics to be an essential release within the genre.

One version of the title track, "See Birds (Moon)", was used in a L'Oreal commercial.

Track listing

References

2010 EPs